The Order of the Beloved Son of the Dragon (Dzongkha : Druk Jong Thuksey) is a Single Class Order ranking fifth in the Order of Precedence. It was instituted by the 3rd King Jigme Dorji Wangchuck on 9 February 1967 an reorganized by the 5th King Jigme Khesar Namgyel Wangchuck on 7 November 2008 and consists of a neck Badge and a matching miniature. Awarded to Members of the Royal Bhutan Army, Royal Bodyguard, National Militia, Royal Bhutan Police and Forest Guards.

Insignia   
The 65 mm badge, comprises a back plate of dorjee the point of which form an outer circle, within which a black enamelled circle encloses the King's portrait in gold, on a background of enameled yellow and orange of the Bhutanese National Flag.

The ribbon is red with orange and yellow stripes on the edges.

References  
 
 Medals of the world, Bhutanese decorations  

Orders, decorations, and medals of Bhutan
Awards established in 2008